Secret Story may refer to:

Books
Secret Story, a novel by Ramsey Campbell  2006
The Secret Story, a novel by Cathy Hopkins 2009

Music
 Secret Story (album), a 1992 album by Pat Metheny
Secret Story, music documentary introducing Secret (South Korean band)

Television
 Secret Story (French TV series)
 Secret Story (Portuguese TV series)
 Secret Story (Spanish TV series)
 Secret Story 2011 (Netherlands)
 Secret Story (Peruvian TV series)
 Secret Story (Lithuanian TV series)

See also
Big Brother (TV series)